C++ Report was a bi-monthly professional computer magazine published by SIGS Publications Group. It was edited by Robert Murray, Stanley B. Lippman, Douglas C. Schmidt, Brad Appleton, Robert Cecil Martin, and Herb Sutter and aimed to cover various issues related to C++ programming language. It was recognized as an important publication related to C++.

Notable contributors 
 Douglas C. Schmidt
 Robert Cecil Martin
 Scott Meyers
 Tom Cargill
 Jim Coplien (a.k.a. James O. Coplien)
 David Abrahams
 Andrew Koenig

References

Bimonthly magazines published in the United States
C++
Defunct computer magazines published in the United States
Magazines established in 1989
Magazines disestablished in 2002
Magazines published in New York City